This is a list of cricketers who have played first-class, List A or Twenty20 cricket for Southern Punjab cricket team. Seasons given are first and last seasons; the player did not necessarily play in all the intervening seasons. Players in bold have played international cricket.

A
M. Asthana, 1964/65

L
Amrit Lal, one appearance in 1967-68 season, against Northern Punjab

S
Balindu Shah, 1941/42

References

Southern Punjab cricketers